Tomasz Zygadło (23 December 1947 – 17 September 2011) was a Polish film director. He directed 26 films between 1967 and 1997. His 1980 film The Moth was entered into the 12th Moscow International Film Festival.

Selected filmography
 The Moth (1980)

References

External links

1947 births
2011 deaths
Polish film directors
Film people from Warsaw